Don de Dieu (French for 'the gift of God') primarily refers to the ship in which Samuel de Champlain reached present-day Quebec in 1608.

Don de Dieu may also refer to:

Ships
Don de Dieu, a French warship captured by the British in 1652
Don de Dieu, a French ship wrecked in 1842 off the French coast 
Don de Dieu, a French ship wrecked in 1846 in the Bay of Biscay 
Don de Dieu, a French fishing smack involved in the rescue of the Eprieve in in 1866 in the North Sea
Don de Dieu, a French ship wrecked in 1870 in Saaremma, Russia

Other uses
Don de Dieu, a Canadian ale produced by Unibroue
Don de Dieu, a 2009 album by  DJ Arafat